Events from the year 1306 in the Kingdom of Scotland.

Incumbents
Monarch – Robert I (from 25 March)

Events
 10 February – Robert the Bruce murders John Comyn before the high altar of Greyfriars Church in Dumfries.
 25 March – Robert the Bruce crowned King of the Scots.
 19 June – Battle of Methven: The forces of the Earl of Pembroke defeat Bruce's Scottish rebels.

Births
unknown date
 John Randolph, 3rd Earl of Moray (died 1346)

Deaths
 10 February – John III Comyn, Lord of Badenoch, nobleman and Guardian of Scotland
 4 August - David de Inchmartin, executed by English by being hanged in Newcastle upon Tyne
 4 August - Alexander Scrymgeour, Scottish standard bearer, executed by English by being hanged in Newcastle upon Tyne
 4 August - John de Seton, executed by English by being hanged, drawn and quartered in Newcastle upon Tyne
 September – Nigel de Brus, younger brother of Robert the Bruce, executed by English by being hanged, drawn and quartered in Berwick-upon-Tweed
 8 September – Simon Fraser, knight, executed by English by being hanged, drawn and quartered in London
 7 November – John of Strathbogie, Earl of Atholl, captured after Battle of Methven, executed by hanging in London
 9 November - Thomas de Brus, younger brother of Robert the Bruce, executed by English by being hanged, drawn and beheaded at Carlisle, Cumberland, England
 unknown – Alexander de Brus, younger brother of Robert the Bruce, executed by English by being hanged, drawn and beheaded at Carlisle, Cumberland, England
 unknown - Christopher Seton, executed by English by being hanged, drawn and quartered at Dumfries

See also

 Timeline of Scottish history

References

 
Years of the 14th century in Scotland
Wars of Scottish Independence